The Slovakia women's national tennis team represents Slovakia in Fed Cup tennis competition and are governed by the Slovak Tennis Association.

History
Slovakia competed in its first Fed Cup in 1994.  They won the Cup in 2002, being led by then top ten player Daniela Hantuchová.

Prior to 1992, Slovak players represented Czechoslovakia.

Current team
Rankings .

Results

1994–1999

2000–2009

2010–2019

2020–2029

Notes

Czech Republic Fed Cup team

References

External links

Billie Jean King Cup teams
Fed Cup
Fed Cup